is a 1998 survival horror video game developed by Sega AM7 and System Sacom for the Sega Saturn. It was the last Saturn game released in Europe. The game offers unique gameplay features such as buttons that allow the player to use items in real-time, aiming while moving, and falling oxygen levels. The music was composed by Kenji Kawai, and the creatures and characters were designed by illustrator Yasushi Nirasawa.

Gameplay 
Players move John Mayor through the pre-rendered rooms of The Big Table which are shown from fixed camera angles using a permanent 3D control scheme. Players can turn on or off certain on-screen indicators such as an oxygen counter, health meter and bullet count. Once armed, players can move using the D-pad and can run while aiming a firearm. The game fully utilises the Saturn's six-button controller, allowing players to have instant access to a map screen as well as real-time use of grenades and health items, which may be used without resorting to the inventory screen.

The Big Table's oxygen supply is dwindling. Therefore, one necessity for survival is to refill low oxygenated areas and thus avoid asphyxiation. Overuse of firearms depletes the oxygen more quickly. In some areas, oxygen can be replenished (an unlimited number of times) by finding yellow oxygen boxes known as Air Systems (AS). When the player has a regulator, an AS allows him to refill it. If the player is not using the oxygen level indicator, a red emergency light will indicate a low oxygen level. Low oxygen level rooms will appear in red on the player's map. Oxygen grenades can be used to replenish low oxygen level rooms or hallways.

If the player is not near an AS or lacks oxygen grenades, they can use a regulator to breathe in low oxygen areas and in flooded areas. Each room entrance has two doors with a vacuum system between them; this ensures that a flooded room will not leak outside the room.

Similarly to Resident Evil, players must draw their weapon with one button and fire it with a different one. The player can move while armed and automatically lock on to enemies by depressing the aim button. There is an option for the player to switch manually between targets.

The Big Table has a large supply of ammunition for a number of different weapons. The weapons and ammunition are located in the weapon storage rooms. However, security is maintained and so some weapons can only be accessed by important individuals in The Big Table. The player obtains these weapons by securing the appropriate weapon storeroom pass-cards.

Plot 
The game takes place 300 meters below the surface of the Pacific Ocean in a naval fueling and research facility known as "The Big Table" (SSB-01). Players assume the role of John Mayor, an ex-Navy SEAL who has joined forces with a civilian rescue organisation called Emergency Rescue Services (ERS). The ERS was one of many civilian corporations who were offered space at The Big Table in order to raise funds after the US Navy cut the facility's budget.

A small capsule from space has landed near The Big Table. It contains a chimpanzee who was launched into space forty years before the start of the game, as part of an experiment about the effects of cosmic radiation on a living creature. The cosmic radiation caused the chimp to undergo a mutation whereby its metabolism slowed and it went into hibernation. Commander Clancy assigns Gena Weisburg to unravel the mystery of the chimp so the same effect may be used to allow humans to travel into deep space.

The Sea Fox, a small but fast nuclear submarine, has been dispatched to refuel at The Big Table and investigate the capsule. The Sea Fox crashes into the base at a part called the Navy Area, The Big Table's top secret research facility. Ignoring the high security level of the Navy Area, the base commander calls in a SEAL team as a primary rescue force, and also sends the ERS to extract an important doctor.

Hostile mutants in The Big Table are troublesome: human beings (both living and undead) are being transformed into grotesque creatures that kill. The hostile mutants are weakened by high levels of oxygen and so they try to destroy The Big Table's oxygen generators.

The mutation creating the hostile mutants is the result of the effect of cosmic radiation on common bacteria. John Mayor, who is afflicted with a cold, is unaffected by the infectious mutation and must try to rescue The Big Table's occupants and escape.

Development 
Deep Fear was co-developed by Sega AM7 and System Sacom. The CGI movies were created by ISCO. The producer was Rieko Kodama, who had worked on multiple Sega projects. Deep Fear was her return to leading game development after a period in management, and she enjoyed the experience due to working with external developers and staff. The game's monsters were designed by noted artist Yasushi Nirasawa. He described the setting as "very movie-like and detailed", but had trouble with the designs due to conflicting requests for creatures that were both familiar and alien. He split the monster designs into three types; being created through a "collage" of human and something else, a "lost generation" second phase, and a stable and more alien design. He was dissatisfied with his final boss design, which strayed from the realistic approach taken with the other characters and monsters in favour of following developer requests. The music was composed and produced by Kenji Kawai.

Release 
Deep Fear was released in Japan on July 16, 1998, for the Sega Saturn, and published by Sega. The Japanese version has all of the spoken dialogue in English along with a good portion of the menus, text and visual clues. The game was released in Europe on June 30, 1998, and was the last Saturn game released in Europe. Deep Fear was not released in North America.

Reception 

Famitsu gave it a score of 30 out of 40. GameSpot gave it a score of 7.8 out of 10.  Multiple publications have noted the similarity between Deep Fear and Resident Evil, going so far to call the game a "Resident Evil clone".

1up.com listed it as one of the top five "Resident Evil Rip-offs" of all time. They questioned Sega's decision to not release the game in North America, feeling that it could have been a quality survival horror series.

In 2009, GamesRadar included Deep Fear among its games "with untapped franchise potential", commenting,

"This atmospheric survival/horror game also used limited air supplies and moody silence to create tension (see Cold Fear and Dead Space.) Though we’re puffing at the gills for BioShock 2, we'd love to get our feet wet in another Deep Fear game."

Both Deep Fear and Resident Evil have been criticized for the voice acting and dialogue.

References

External links 
 

1998 video games
1990s horror video games
Naval video games
Sega video games
Sega Saturn games
Sega Saturn-only games
Single-player video games
Survival video games
Video games scored by Kenji Kawai
Video games with underwater settings
Video games developed in Japan